The 2002–03 Cincinnati Bearcats men's basketball team represented University of Cincinnati as a member of Conference USA during the 2002–03 NCAA Division I men's basketball season. The head coach was Bob Huggins, serving in his 14th year at the school. The team finished third in the American division of the conference regular season standings and won the Conference USA tournament title to earn an automatic bid to the NCAA tournament as No. 8 seed in the West region. Cincinnati was beaten in the opening round by No. 9 seed Gonzaga, 74–69. The Bearcats finished with a 17–12 record (9–7 C-USA).

Roster

Source

Schedule and results

|-
!colspan=12 style=|Regular Season 

|-
!colspan=12 style=|Conference USA Tournament 

|-
!colspan=12 style=|NCAA Tournament

Rankings

References

Cincinnati Bearcats men's basketball seasons
Cincinnati
Cincinnati
Cincin
Cincin